Lee Jun-ho (born 27 January 1989) is a South Korean footballer who plays as full back for Suwon FC in K League 2.

Career
Lee was selected by Incheon United in the 2012 K League draft, but he made no appearance at his first club.

He moved to K League Challenge side Suwon FC after the 2012 season.

References

External links 

1989 births
Living people
Association football fullbacks
South Korean footballers
Incheon United FC players
Suwon FC players
K League 1 players
K League 2 players